Switzerland competed at the Eurovision Song Contest 1988, held in Dublin, Ireland.

The Swiss entry, which won the competition, was Céline Dion with the French language song "Ne partez pas sans moi", composed by Atilla Şereftuğ and Nella Martinetti.

Before Eurovision

National final 
The Swiss entry for the Eurovision Song Contest 1988 was selected through a national final. The final was held on 6 February 1988 at the Théâtre de Beausobre in Morges, hosted by Serge Moisson. There were  originally meant to be ten songs competing, but the song "Smile" by Yama was disqualified as the singer did not meet the minimum age requirements. The winner was selected by three regional juries, a press jury and another jury of experts.

At Eurovision
Dion performed 9th on the night of the contest, following Israel and preceding Ireland. She went on to win the contest, receiving 137 points in total.

The Swiss conductor at the contest was the composer of the song, Atilla Şereftuğ.

Voting

Congratulations: 50 Years of the Eurovision Song Contest

In 2005, "Ne partez pas sans moi" was one of fourteen songs chosen by Eurovision fans and an EBU reference group to participate in the Congratulations anniversary competition. It was the only Swiss entry featured, although several Swiss entries were featured in clip montages and Lys Assia, who won the first-ever contest on behalf of Switzerland, made an appearance performing her winning entry "Refrain." The special was broadcast live on all three major Swiss public broadcasters, with 1991 Swiss entrant Sandra Studer commentating in German, Serge Moisson commentating in French, and Sandy Altermatt commentating in Italian.

"Ne partez pas sans moi" appeared eleventh in the running order, following "Everyway That I Can" by Sertab Erener and preceding "Hold Me Now" by Johnny Logan. Like the majority of entries that night, the performance was mostly by a group of dancers alongside footage of Dion's Eurovision performance; however, Dion was unavailable to make an in-person appearance (perhaps understandably, as her fame had increased significantly in the wake of her victory). At the end of the first round, "Ne partez pas sans moi" was not one of the five entries announced as proceeding to the second round. It was later revealed that the song finished tenth with 98 points.

Voting

References

1988
Countries in the Eurovision Song Contest 1988
Eurovision
Celine Dion